13 Boötis is a solitary variable star in the northern constellation of Boötes, and is positioned near the western constellation border with Ursa Major. It has the variable star designation CF Boötis, often abbreviated CF Boo, while 13 Boötis is the star's Flamsteed designation. This star has a reddish hue and is faintly visible to the naked eye with an apparent visual magnitude that fluctuates around 5.26. It is located at a distance of approximately 700 light years from the Sun based on parallax, but is drifting closer with a radial velocity of −14 km/s.

This is an aging red giant star on the asymptotic giant branch with a stellar classification of M1.5III, which is interpreted by stellar evolutionary models to mean it has exhausted the supply of hydrogen at its core then cooled and expanded off the main sequence. It is classified as a slow irregular variable of the Lb type, and its brightness has been observed to vary from +5.29 down to +5.38. The star has ~74 times the girth of the Sun and is radiating 1,114 times the Sun's luminosity from its swollen photosphere at an effective temperature of 3,889 K.

This was first reported by William Herschel in 1783.

Possible planetary system

In 1991, Duquennoy & Mayor reported the possible presence of a low-mass object (of likely substellar nature) orbiting the red giant 13 Bootis. They set a minimum mass of 30 times that of Jupiter (likely a brown dwarf) and estimated an orbital period of 1.35 years. So far there has been no confirmation about the presence a substellar object.

References

External links
 HR 5300
 CCDM J14082+4927
 Image 13 Boötis
 
 

M-type giants
Slow irregular variables
Hypothetical planetary systems

Boötes
Durchmusterung objects
Bootis, 13
123782
069068
5300
Bootis, CF